John Baylor Nalbandian (born March 15, 1969) is a United States circuit judge of the United States Court of Appeals for the Sixth Circuit. He was previously a partner in the Cincinnati office of Taft Stettinius & Hollister.

Biography 

Nalbandian received his Bachelor of Science from the Wharton School of the University of Pennsylvania and his Juris Doctor from the University of Virginia School of Law with the Order of the Coif honor.

At the start of his legal career Nalbandian served as a law clerk to Judge Jerry Edwin Smith of the United States Court of Appeals for the Fifth Circuit. He then went on to be an associate at Jones Day, where he practiced for five years. In 2000, he joined Taft Stettinius & Hollister and eventually became a partner, where he continued to work until becoming a judge.

Nalbandian was appointed by Governor of Kentucky Ernie Fletcher to serve as a Special Justice of the Kentucky Supreme Court in 2007. In 2010, he was nominated by President Barack Obama and confirmed by the Senate to be a board member of the State Justice Institute. He resigned his seat on the Board of Directors on July 11, 2018. He was a member of the Magistrate Judge Merit Selection Panel for the United States District Court for the Eastern District of Kentucky. He has been a member of the Federalist Society since 1991.

Federal judicial service 

On January 23, 2018, President Donald Trump announced his intent to nominate Nalbandian to an undetermined seat on the United States Court of Appeals for the Sixth Circuit. On January 24, 2018, his nomination was sent to the United States Senate. He was nominated to the seat being vacated by Judge John M. Rogers, who announced his intention to assume senior status on a date to be determined. On March 7, 2018, a hearing on his nomination was held before the Senate Judiciary Committee. On April 19, 2018, his nomination was reported out of committee by an 11–10 vote. On May 11, 2018 the Senate invoked cloture on his nomination by a 52–43 vote. On May 15, 2018, his nomination was confirmed by a 53–45 vote. He received his commission on May 17, 2018.

Personal life 

Nalbandian's mother was born in a Japanese American internment camp during World War II.

See also 
 List of Asian American jurists

References

External links 
 
 

|-

1969 births
Living people
20th-century American lawyers
21st-century American lawyers
21st-century American judges
American jurists of Japanese descent
Federalist Society members
Judges of the United States Court of Appeals for the Sixth Circuit
Kentucky lawyers
Kentucky Republicans
Ohio lawyers
People from Fort Ord, California
United States court of appeals judges appointed by Donald Trump
University of Virginia School of Law alumni
Wharton School of the University of Pennsylvania alumni
Jones Day people